Ana Asensio (born 4 April 1978) is an actress and filmmaker born in Madrid and currently living in New York City.

Career

Asensio got her professional start acting in children's plays while she was studying Acting and Philosophy at Complutense University in Madrid.

Her directorial debut Most Beautiful Island premiered at the 2017 SXSW Film Festival where it was awarded the narrative grand jury prize for best film. Asensio wrote the screenplay and played the leading role. Most Beautiful Island was nominated for the John Cassavetes Award at the 2018 Film Independent Spirit Awards. Most Beautiful Island has received a 93% positive rating on Rotten Tomatoes.

Ana Asensio was a lead in the popular Spanish TV series Nada Es Para Siempre.

Filmography

Movies 
I Miss You (2019)
Most Beautiful Island (2017)
Like Me (2017)
The Archive (2015) 
Carne Cruda (2011)  	
Zenith (2010) 
The Afterlight (2009)
The Kovak Box (2006) 
Betty la Flaca (2006)  
White (2005)  
Alone (2004)  
El lápiz del carpintero (2003)
Intacto (2001)

TV Series 
Todo es possible en el bajo (2012)
Las chicas de oro (2010)
Mujeres de vida alegre (2010)
Planta 25 (TV Series) (2008)
Nada es para siempre (1999–2000) 
Señor Alcalde (1998) 
Más que amigos

Personal life 
In 2001 Asensio moved to New York City. She is married to film director Craig William Macneill.

References

1978 births
Actresses from Madrid
Living people